"Where Did Your Heart Go?" is a song written by American musicians David Was and Don Was. The song was recorded and released by the writers' band Was (Not Was) as a single in the UK as a double A-side with "Wheel Me Out" in September 1981. The single did not chart. It is featured as the second track on the band's debut album Was (Not Was) in August 1981. French editions of the single include the track "It's an Attack!" as the B-side.

A live recording of "Where Did Your Heart Go?" was included as a B-side to the 1992 single "Somewhere in America (There's a Street Named After My Dad)".

Track listing

Wham! version

"Where Did Your Heart Go?" was covered by British pop duo Wham! in 1986 as one of the three B-sides to "The Edge of Heaven", which reached number one in the UK. The song was also released separately as Wham!'s final single in several territories, most notably in the US where it peaked at number 50 on the Billboard Hot 100 in November 1986. It was produced and re-arranged by George Michael with engineering by Chris Porter. "Where Did Your Heart Go?" was also included on the compilation albums The Final and Music from the Edge of Heaven.

Arrangement
George Michael's arrangement of "Where Did Your Heart Go?" is relatively faithful to the Was (Not Was) version making only subtle changes to the song's instrumentation and structure. Michael alters the song by dropping the opening chorus in favour of an instrumental introduction of the chorus melody. The subdued ending is protracted in the Wham! recording, where the original quickly fades out after the completion of the final chorus; Michael's arrangement continues for an additional half a minute.

Wham!'s recording of "Where Did Your Heart Go?", while structurally similar to the Was (Not Was) original, leans toward a soft rock ballad due to changes to the tempo and vocal inflexion. Michael's arrangement is more spare and reliant on synthesizers and saxophone to convey the melody. Michael's vocals are less immersed in the backing arrangement in which the bass guitar and drums are markedly quieter in the mix. His vocal is more low-key than Sweet Pea Atkinson's, except for the final line of the third verse, "and drifted out of sight", which is accentuated.

Music video
The official music video for the Wham! version of the song was directed by George Michael and Andy Morahan.

Track listing

Personnel
 George Michael – keyboards, programming, producer, arrangements
 Deon Estus – bass
 Danny Schogger – keyboards
 Andy Hamilton – saxophone
 Chris Porter – engineer, mixing

Chart performance

References

1981 songs
1981 singles
1986 singles
Was (Not Was) songs
ZE Records singles
Island Records singles
Song recordings produced by Don Was
Songs written by David Was
Songs written by Don Was
Wham! songs
Epic Records singles
Columbia Records singles
Music videos directed by Andy Morahan
Music videos directed by George Michael
Song recordings produced by George Michael
Pop ballads